Djibi, the Kitten is the last novel of Felix Salten, published originally in 1945 and translated into English in 1946. Similarly as in other Salten's late books, the protagonist is an animal, this time a young female cat called Djibi.

In Renni the Rescuer, the main animal character had been a loyal servant to humans, but Djibi is an independent cat who chooses for herself where to live. The novel begins dramatically with a drowning attempt which the young kitten survives. A boy rescues her from the river and takes to his home where a dog adopts her and feeds along with other puppies. But when the boy rebuffs the cat, she leaves the farm immediately and, for a while, lives in the forest and kills pheasants. After being wounded by a gamekeeper, she decides to take shelter with humans again, and a kind teacher, Salten's alter ego, adopts her. After that, Djibi lives with the teacher and his wife, but her strong hunting instinct finally leads Djibi to her demise.

The main theme of the book are the reciprocal interactions between men and animals, especially cats and dogs. Unlike in Salten's earlier animal novels, for instance Bambi's Children, there isn't much anthropomorphism in Djibi — there is only one short dialogue between Djibi and a marten. The human characters, in contrast to the animals in the book, mostly have no personal names, but are referred to as “the teacher,” “the farmer,” etc.

The first English translation of Djibi by Raya Levin appeared in the United Kingdom in 1946, illustrated by Walter Linsenmaier as the original Swiss edition, but there is also an anonymous American translation, Jibby the Cat, illustrated by Fritz Kredel, which was published in 1948 by Julian Messner in New York City. This edition differs greatly from Salten's original text. Not only has it a happy ending — Djibi's death is left out — but it also has a happy opening added to it: the novel begins with five pages depicting Djibi's (or Jibby's) sweet life before the attempt on her life. The novel has been largely rewritten, and new incidents have been added to the story. For instance, in the Swiss and the British edition, the boy takes the kitten from the river directly to his home, but in the American edition, he first takes it to the teacher (or “schoolmaster Victor” in this edition). The Americal edition also adds chapter numbers and chapter titles to the book, and most human characters have personal names.

For example, the episode where Djibi decides to leave the farm is very different in the two English-language editions. The British edition follows very closely Salten's original German-language text, but the American edition has it rewritten:

The book has also been translated at least into French in 1946 and into Swedish in 1974, both with Linsenmaier's illustrations; the Swedish translation is slightly shortened. A 2016 Finnish translation is unillustrated. In 2016, Raya Levin's translation was published also in the United States, illustrated presumably by Richard Cowdrey.

References

Novels by Felix Salten
1945 novels
Swiss novels
Fiction with alternate endings
Novels about cats